The National University of Formosa (UNF) is an Argentine national university, situated in the city of Formosa, capital of Formosa Province. Its precursor, the University Institute of Formosa, was established in 1971 as a campus of the National University of the Northeast.

See also
Argentine Universities
Science and technology in Argentina
Science and Education in Argentina
Argentine Higher Education Official Site

External links

Formosa
Educational institutions established in 1988
Universities in Formosa Province
1988 establishments in Argentina